"Bring Out the Freak in You" is a song by hip hop recording artist Lil Rob from his sixth studio album Twelve Eighteen, Pt. 1. It was released in 2006 via Upstairs Records as the second single from the album. Production was handled by Moox.

Charts

References

2005 songs
2006 singles
Dirty rap songs